Shane Baker is an American politician serving as a member of the Kentucky House of Representatives from the 85th district. Elected in November 2020, he assumed office on January 1, 2021.

Career 
Baker previously worked as a field representative with the Kentucky Department for Local Government and operated a small business. He was elected to the Kentucky House of Representatives in November 2020 and assumed office on January 1, 2021.

Baker sponsored House Bill 112, which would prohibit requiring COVID-19 vaccinations for kids without the consent of all guardians.

Committee Assignments 

 Primary & Secondary Ed & Workforce Development
 Education (Vice Chair)
 Families and Children
 Economic Development & Workforce Investment

References 

Living people
Republican Party members of the Kentucky House of Representatives
People from Somerset, Kentucky
Year of birth missing (living people)